Kani (also Romanized as Kānī; also known as Kahni, Kohneh, and Kownī) is a village in Dulab Rural District, Shahab District, Qeshm County, Hormozgan Province, Iran. At the 2006 census, its population was 311, in 65 families.

References 

Populated places in Qeshm County